The 2021 South Carolina Gamecocks baseball team represented the University of South Carolina in the 2021 NCAA Division I baseball season. The 2021 season marked the Gamecocks' 128th overall. The Gamecocks played their home games at Founders Park, and were led by fourth year head coach Mark Kingston.

Personnel

Roster

Coaching staff

Opening Day lineup

Regular season

February: undefeated start and Series win over Clemson, Clarke named player of the month
Dayton (Opening day)

South Carolina opened its season with a 12–1 drubbing of Dayton, it was their first game since March 10, 2020. Thomas Farr threw 8 strikeouts and allow only one run. Freshman relivers Cotto, Phipps, and Mahoney each pitched one scoreless inning. Junior Wes Clarke would go 3–4 with 2 HR's and 5 RBI in game 2 of the series. Wimmer, Burgess, and Brady Allen also each homered in a 12–5 win over the Flyers. Game 3 saw the Gamecocks complete the sweep after a 4 run eight inning led by junior David Mendham's bases clearing double. The Dayton series was the first time the two schools have ever met.

vs. Clemson (Greenville)

The Gamecocks would go on to route Winthrop 12–4, behind Wes Clarke's three home runs, bringing his 4-game total to 6 HR's, with a .749 batting avg. 12 RBI, and a 2.308 slugging pct. Clarke would earn National player of the week honors. South Carolina faced their first test vs. Clemson on February 27, after the opening game of the series was postponed. Wes Clarke opened things up with an RBI single, Clemson tied things up at 2 with a home run in the ninth, sending the games to extra innings. Freshman reliever Will Sanders got out of a first and second no out jam in the top of the 11th, and Andrew Eyster hit a game winning double in the bottom of the inning, after a Brady Allen double.

Clemson

Game 2 of the series would also prove a thrilling one, after Clemson opened with a first inning run, Wes Clarke  hit his 7th HR in the 3rd to tie the game at 1. In the 5th, Clemson took the lead 3–1 after a two run double, the Gamecocks quickly responded in the bottom half highlighted by Wes Clarke's 8th home run in 6 games, a three run shot to put the Gamecocks in the lead 5–3. The two teams would go on to trade leads, culminating in a 7–7 tie heading into the 9th. After Will Sanders got out of a jam in the top of the inning, Andrew Eyster came through with his second straight walk-off hit, with a single to score Clark and to clinch the series win.

Wes Clarke would be named national player of the month for February, after finishing batting .636 with 8 home runs, 17 RBI and a 1.818 slugging percentage.

March: Texas series, start of SEC play
Mercer

After another midweek crushing of Winthrop 19–8, The Gamecocks would sweep Mercer with dominate pitching (5–1, 4–0, 1–0) allowing just one run the entire series, combining for 44 strikeouts. South Carolina's 10–0 start is the best start since the 2016 team, who then went on to win 20 conference games and win the SEC East. South Carolina has had a ton of great starts to seasons in its history, most notably in 2000 when Ray Tanner's team started off 22–0, and also starting out 18–0 in 2004. Legendary coaches Bobby Richardson and June Raines, also each had seasons where they started out with 13 wins.

at Texas

South Carolina traveled to Austin, Texas after starting the season 11–0 to face the legendary Longhorns in a three-game set. The Gamecocks would go on to be swept losing by a combined total of 6–15.

at Vanderbilt

The Gamecocks took one of three to open up conference play vs. Vanderbilt, losing the first two games 2–3, 0–5, and winning the third 6–5.

Florida

The Gamecocks won their first SEC home game in a five-hour thriller, that culminated with a Andrew Eyster game tying home run in the 14th, when the Gamecocks were down to their final strike. In that same inning, Colin Burgess would hit a walk off double scoring Jeff Heinrich who got on base via a single, to win the game 9–8.

Wes Clarke hit his NCAA leading 12th home run to clinch South Carolina's first series win over Florida since 2011.

Brady Allen homered twice, Clarke homered to improve his NCAA best HR total to 13, Sanders, Bosnic, Kerry struck out 14 to help the Gamecocks earn their first SEC sweep of the season against the #5 ranked Gators.

April: Georgia, LSU, Arkansas series 
at Georgia

South Carolina won their first SEC road series, taking 2 out of 3 from Georgia.

Missouri

After dropping the first game in the series 1–7, the Gamecocks bounced back in Game 2, winning 11–1. In Game 3 of the series, the Gamecocks won 13–4.

at LSU

South Carolina once again dropped the opening game of the series to LSU, after Friday's game was postponed, the last two games of the series were back to back 7 inning doubleheaders on Saturday. In game 1 of the doubleheader, South Carolina trailed 2–0 heading into the seventh inning, Mendham and Burgess led off the inning with singles, after a sac bunt moved the runners into scoring position, Wimmer tied the game with a two run double. Brady Allen would also double, giving the Gamecocks a 4–2 lead, Kerry came in for the save in the bottom half of the inning giving the Gamecocks the win.

The Gamecocks dominated Game two of the doubleheader from the start, putting up 14 hits in the seven innings, Mendham and Wimmer each homered, Will Sanders pitched 6 scoreless innings, and Julian Bosnic came in for a scoreless seventh inning.

Arkansas

May: end of regular season play, early exit from Hoover

Mississippi State

The Gamecocks lost the first two games of the series.

After Mendham's HR made it 2–0 Gamecocks, Mississippi State came back scoring three runs to take the lead. Heading into the ninth, SC was down one run, Heinrich doubled to right scoring Myers tying the game, sending it to extra innings. In the eleventh Heinrich singled with one out, and was able to score on Mendham's double to left, winning the game 4–3.

at Kentucky

Carolina opened up the series with a monster four run first inning, on five hits, Wimmer tripled home two. Kentucky would score three in the third inning cutting the lead to one, before SC scored three in the fourth, and three in the fifth. Kentucky added three runs in the seventh to cut it to 10–6, the Gamecocks added insurance runs with a run in the eight, and a run in the ninth on a Wimmer solo home run. Bosnic earned the save going two innings striking out four.

Sightler opened the game with an RBI ground out, Mendham would also have an RBI ground out in the fifth making it 2–0, in the sixth Carolina broke it open with a Andrew Eyster grand slam, his second grand slam of the season, making it 6–0. After adding another run in the eight, Wimmer hit a two run home run in the ninth to make it 9–0. Brett Kerry pitched a complete game shutout, the first by a Gamecock pitcher since Wil Crowe in a regional game in 2014.

The Gamecocks scored three in the third, Eyster doubled home a run, and Sightler hit a two run home run, they would add three in the fourth inning to make it 6–0 thanks to a two run double by Wes Clarke. Kentucky added a unearned run in the fourth to make it 6–1, and added two more in the sixth, in the seventh Allen singled home two runs to make it 9–3, and Eyster had another hit with a RBI single. The Gamecocks went on to win the game 11–6, Will Sanders pitched a scoreless ninth inning in relief.

Tennessee

South Carolina dropped Game 1 of the series, Wes Clarke and Andrew Eyster both homered, but Jordan's poor start proved to be too much to overcome.

The Gamecocks took Game 2 of the series with a three run home run from Brett Kerry in the sixth, and seven quality innings from Brett Kerry. Bosnic would pick up the save shutting down the Vols in the final two frames.

SC's late rally attempt came up just short, as the Gamecocks lost a heartbreaking one run game to finish the regular season.

Alabama (SEC Tournament)

The Gamecocks disturbing history in Hoover continued as they fell hard to elimination eliminated in the opening game against unranked Alabama, not even making it past Tuesday before heading home.

Postseason

Columbia Regional
Virginia

Wes Clarke opened up the Columbia regional with his NCAA best 23rd home run of the season in the first inning, starter Brett Kerry was pulled in the third due to injury, replaced by Julian Bosnic. The Gamecocks trailed 3–1 heading into the bottom of the sixth before Josiaha Sightler would hit a two run RBI double, after Wes Clarkes ground rule double put two in scoring position. After that catcher Collin Burgess singled giving the gamecocks a 4–3 lead. Daniel Lloyd came in to relieve Bosnic in the seventh, and he would not allow a run over the following three innings to get the save and put South Carolina into the winners bracket.

Old Dominion

The Gamecocks faced Old Dominion in Game 2 of the regional in a low scoring pitchers duel, both starters would pitch 7 innings only allowing one run. In the 8th inning, South Carolina left starter Thomas Farr in a batter too long, walking in what would end up being the game winning run, as the Gamecocks sent themselves into the losers bracket of their own regional.

Virginia (Elimination game)

After giving up three runs in the first three innings, the Gamecocks rallied back to cut the lead to just one late with a Wes Clarke RBI ground out, and a Milone solo home run, but Virginia's closer Schoch would come in the 7th and shut down the Gamecocks, striking out five of the eight batters he faced. The tough one run loss eliminated South Carolina from their own regional.

Schedule and results

Columbia Regional

Rankings

Record vs. conference opponents

2021 MLB draft

Bosnic did not sign with the Giants and returned to South Carolina.

References

South Carolina
South Carolina Gamecocks baseball seasons
South Carolina Gamecocks baseball
South Carolina